is a Japanese film actor.

He was featured in 11 films directed by Masaki Kobayashi, including The Human Condition trilogy, wherein he starred as the lead character Kaji, plus Harakiri, Samurai Rebellion and Kwaidan.

Nakadai worked with some of Japan's best-known filmmakers—starring or co-starring in five films directed by Akira Kurosawa, as well as being cast in significant films directed by Hiroshi Teshigahara (The Face of Another), Mikio Naruse (When a Woman Ascends the Stairs), Kihachi Okamoto (Kill! and The Sword of Doom), Hideo Gosha (Goyokin), Shirō Toyoda (Portrait of Hell) and Kon Ichikawa (Enjō and Odd Obsession).

Biography

Nakadai grew up in a very poor family and was unable to afford a university education, prompting him to take up acting. He picked up a liking of  Broadway musicals, and travelled once a year to New York City to watch them. Nakadai was working as a shop clerk in Tokyo before a chance encounter with director Masaki Kobayashi led to him being cast in the film The Thick Walled Room. The following year, he made a brief and uncredited cameo in Akira Kurosawa's Seven Samurai where he is seen for a few seconds as a samurai walking through town. Nakadai's role in Seven Samurai was technically his debut as The Thick-Walled Room'''s release was delayed for three years due to controversial subject matter. His major breakthrough as an actor came when he was given the part of Jo, a young yakuza in Black River, another film directed by Kobayashi. Nakadai continued to work with Kobayashi into the 1960s and won his first Blue Ribbon Award for his role in Harakiri (his personal favorite among his own films) as the aging rōnin Hanshiro Tsugumo.

Nakadai appeared in two more Kurosawa films from the 1980s. In Kagemusha Nakadai plays both the titular thief turned body-double and the famous daimyō Takeda Shingen whom the thief is tasked with impersonating. This dual role helped him win his second Blue Ribbon Award for Best Actor. In Ran Nakadai plays another daimyo, Hidetora Ichimonji (loosely based on King Lear from Shakespeare's play King Lear and inspired by the historical daimyo Mōri Motonari).

He taught and trained promising young actors including Kōji Yakusho, Mayumi Wakamura, Tōru Masuoka, Azusa Watanabe, Kenichi Takitō and others.

In 2015, he received the Order of Culture.

Filmography

 Film 

 Animated film  

 Theater 

 Television 

 Honours 
Chevalier De L’Ordre des Arts et des Lettres (1992)
Medal with Purple Ribbon (1996)
Order of the Rising Sun, 4th Class, Gold Rays with Rosette (2003)
Person of Cultural Merit (2007)
Asahi Prize (2013)
Kawakita Award (2013)
Toshiro Mifune Award (2015)
Order of Culture (2015)

References

Further reading
Dowsing, Martin. The Face of an Actor - The Life and Films of Tatsuya Nakadai''. Testudines, 2021.

External links

  by Chuck Stephens
 
 
 http://www.criterion.com/explore/195-tatsuya-nakadai
 http://www.tohokingdom.com/people/tatsuya_nakadai.htm
 https://www.amc.com/talk/2008/06/an-evening-with

1932 births
Living people
People from Tokyo
Japanese male actors
Taiga drama lead actors
Recipients of the Medal with Purple Ribbon
Recipients of the Order of the Rising Sun, 4th class
Persons of Cultural Merit
Recipients of the Order of Culture